E Pluribus M Ross is the second full-length studio album by American songwriter M Ross Perkins. It was released on March 18, 2022, on Colemine/Karma Chief Records.

Track listing
All songs written and performed by M Ross Perkins.

 "Industrial Good Day Mantra" – 4:16
 "Wrong Wrong Wrong" – 2:56
 "The New American Laureate" – 3:35
 "This One" – 4:15
 "Tired of Me" – 4:20
 "It's Your Boy" – 3:56
 "The Clock Reads 60 Seconds from Now" – 1:00
 "Venti Gasp Inhale" – 3:50
 "Mr. Marble Eyes (Marbles for His Eyes)" – 3:39
 "Butterscotch Revue" – 4:10
 "Pinball Blonde" – 3:33
 "Funeral for a Satellite" – 5:13

Personnel
Performance
 M Ross Perkins – all voices and instruments

Production
 M Ross Perkins - producer
 JJ Golden – mastering engineer
 Autumn Barney - cover design
 Leroi Conroy - cover design
 Whitney Pelfrey - photography

Notes

2022 albums
M Ross Perkins albums